21Vianet Group is the largest carrier-neutral Internet and data center service provider in China. It is the exclusive operator of Microsoft Azure and Microsoft 365 services in China, and also houses data centers for Alibaba and other Chinese companies.

References

Technology companies of China